Saint-Laurent-d'Olt (literally Saint-Laurent of Olt) is a commune in the Aveyron department in southern France.

Geography
Situated on the D988 departmental road, roughly equidistant between the towns of Millau, Rodez and Mende, and 3.5 km west of the A75 autoroute, Saint-Laurent-d'Olt is perched on a rocky ridge above the river Lot, at about 584 metres above sea level.  The upper valley of the Lot divides the volcanic plateau of the Aubrac from the limestone plateaux of the Grands Causses.

In order to preserve the biodiversity of the area, the upper Lot valley between Espalion and Saint-Laurent-d'Olt is gazetted as part of the Natura 2000 network.

The commune is also part of the Parc naturel régional des Grands Causses.

Institut Médico-Educatif (I.M.E.)
As well as providing services for the surrounding district, the village is home to an Institut Médico-Educatif, which is a residential school for children with intellectual handicaps, aged 6–20. The current roll is around 80 pupils. Founded in 1965, the Institut is the largest employer in the commune, employing 60 people.

Population

See also
 Communes of the Aveyron department

References

External links

 Official website of the Mairie

Communes of Aveyron
Aveyron communes articles needing translation from French Wikipedia